Code scaling, applicability, and uncertainty or CSAU methodology is a systematic approach proposed by the US Nuclear Regulatory Commission that can be used to identify and quantify overall nuclear reactor uncertainties, and this estimate methods for reactor safety analysis is in lieu of the earlier licensing practice that used deterministic methods with conservative assumptions to address uncertainties. Since the methodology was proposed about two decades ago, it has been widely used for new reactor designs and existing light water reactor power uprates.

References

External links
 Application of code scaling applicability and uncertainty methodology to the large break loss of coolant
 Quantifying reactor safety margins part 1: An overview of the code scaling, applicability, and uncertainty evaluation methodology

Nuclear safety and security